Cirsium barnebyi, or Barneby's thistle, is a North American plant species native to the Rocky Mountains of the western United States. It is reported from 6 counties in 3 states: Rio Blanco and Garfield Counties, Colorado; Uintah, Carbon and Duchesne Counties, Utah; and Carbon County, Wyoming.

Flower heads 1-20, borne at the top of the plant or on the tips of the branches. The phyllaries (modified leaves around the base of the heads) bear sharp spines. Flowers are lavender to pinkish-purple.

References

barnebyi
Flora of Colorado
Flora of Wyoming
Flora of Utah
Flora of the Rocky Mountains
Plants described in 1981
Flora without expected TNC conservation status